Werner Geissler (born 1953) is a German businessman, with extensive experience in the United States, Japan, Europe and Emerging Markets.

Biography

Early life
Werner Geissler was born in 1953 in Hachenburg, Heuzert, Germany. After graduation from the Gymnasium Marienstatt in 1972, he joined the Air Force. He received an M.B.A. (Diplom-Kaufmann) from the University of Cologne in 1979.

Career
He joined Procter & Gamble as Assistant Brand Manager after graduation in 1979. He held positions of increasing scope and responsibility in Marketing/Brand Management (e.g. BM for Mr. Proper, Pampers) before becoming Marketing Director in Holland and Germany. In 1991, he was  promoted to General Manager of a new Cosmetics and Fragrances business unit before becoming Vice President of Fine Fragrances for the Western Hemisphere, based in Santa Monica/California.  Following stints as Vice President for the Laundry, Cleaning & Paper business in Germany as well as subsequently for P&G's operation in Turkey/Caucasia/Central Asia, Geissler became  President of P&G's business in Northeast Asia in 2001. In 2004 he was promoted to Group President for the Central & Eastern Europe, Middle East and Africa business unit. In July 2007, he became Vice Chairman in charge of Global Operations with responsibility for all country and manufacturing operations globally and served in this capacity until his retirement in January 2015, after almost 36 years of service.

Post-retirement, Geissler has been  an Operating Partner at the Private Equity Firm Advent International. He is also an active investor in several Start ups covering a broad range of industries. Amongst those are Pedilay (a novel foot care product); SpinDiag (a new-to-the-world approach to rapid diagnosis of drug-resistant bacteria) and HealthVector, a unique health tracking and medical record administration tool based in Boston.

He sits on the Board of Directors of the Goodyear Tire and Rubber Company, Philip Morris International, and he is a member of the World Business Council for Sustainable Development. He has been an Advisor to the Governor of the Hyōgo Prefecture in Japan.

He has served on the Supervisory  Board of the International Institute for Management Development in Lausanne, Switzerland from 2007 to 2017, on the Management Board of GS 1 from 2008 to 2015, and on the Summit Committee of the Consumer Goods Forum. He is the recipient of an Honorary Doctorate from the International University in Geneva. Geissler has also served on the BoD of economiesuisse. In 2005, he was awarded an Honorary Doctorate from the International University in Geneva and in 2013, Geissler was appointed Visiting Professor at China Executive Leadership Academy in Pudong/Shanghai (CELAP).

Personal life
Geissler and his family have lived in places like Frankfurt, Rotterdam, Los Angeles, Istanbul, Kobe, Geneva and Cincinnati. He is now based in Munich. In 2012, he served as International Chair of the World Choir Games. In 2018, he served as "Schirmherr"of the 750th Anniversary of his birthplace, Heuzert/Westerwald. He is married to his wife Sabine and has 2 daughters, Anna and Lena.

References

Businesspeople from Rhineland-Palatinate
Procter & Gamble people
1953 births
Living people
Goodyear Tire and Rubber Company people
Businesspeople from Cincinnati
People from Westerwaldkreis
German expatriates in the United States
University of Cologne alumni